The 33rd Guam Legislature was a meeting of the Guam Legislature. It convened in Hagatna, Guam on January 5, 2015 and ended on January 2, 2017, during the 1st and 2nd years of Eddie Calvo's 2nd Gubernatorial Term.

In the 2014 Guamanian general election, the Democratic Party of Guam won a majority of seats in the Guam Legislature.

Party Summary

Leadership

Legislative
 Speaker: Judith T.P. Won Pat
 Vice Speaker: Benjamin J.F. Cruz
 Legislative Secretary: Tina Muna Barnes

Majority (Democratic)
 Majority Leader: Rory J. Respicio
 Assistant Majority Leader: Thomas C. Ada
 Majority Whip: Dennis G. Rodriguez, Jr.
 Assistant Majority Whip: Michael F.Q. San Nicolas

Minority (Republican)
 Minority Leader: V. Anthony "Tony" Ada
 Assistant Minority Leader: Brant McCreadie
 Minority Whip: Mary Camacho Torres
 Assistant Minority Whip: Thomas A. Morrison

Membership

Committees

References 

Legislature of Guam
Politics of Guam
Political organizations based in Guam